The 2020 Rally Sweden (also known as the Rally Sweden 2020) was a motor racing event for rally cars that was held over four days between 13 and 16 February 2020. It marked the sixty-eighth running of Rally Sweden and was the second round of the 2020 World Rally Championship, World Rally Championship-2 and World Rally Championship-3. It was also the first round of the Junior World Rally Championship. The 2020 event was based in the town of Torsby in Värmland County and consists of eleven special stages.

Ott Tänak and Martin Järveoja were the defending rally winners. Toyota Gazoo Racing WRT, the team they drove for in 2019, were the defending manufacturers' winners. Mads Østberg and Torstein Eriksen were the defending winners in the World Rally Championship-2 category. Ole Christian Veiby and Jonas Andersson were the reigning World Rally Championship-3 winners, but are not defending their WRC-3 title as they joined the WRC-2 category in 2020. Tom Kristensson and Henrik Appelskog were the defending winners in the Junior World Rally Championship.

Elfyn Evans and Scott Martin were the overall winners of the rally, winning the Rally Sweden for the first time. Their team, Toyota Gazoo Racing WRT, were the manufacturers' winners. Mads Østberg and Torstein Eriksen successfully defended their titles in the WRC-2 category. Jari Huttunen and Mikko Lukka were the winners in the WRC-3 category, while Tom Kristensson and Henrik Appelskog won the junior class.

Background

Championship standings prior to the event
Thierry Neuville and Nicolas Gilsoul entered the round with an eight-point lead over the six-time world champions Sébastien Ogier and Julien Ingrassia. Elfyn Evans and Scott Martin were third, a further five points behind. In the World Rally Championship for Manufacturers, defending manufacturers' champions Hyundai Shell Mobis WRT held a two-point lead over Toyota Gazoo Racing WRT, followed by M-Sport Ford WRT.

In the World Rally Championship-2 standings, Mads Østberg and Torstein Eriksen held a seven-point lead ahead of Adrien Fourmaux and Renaud Jamoul in the drivers' and co-drivers' standings respectively, with Nikolay Gryazin and Yaroslav Fedorov in third. In the manufacturer' championship, M-Sport Ford WRT led PH-Sport by five points.

In the World Rally Championship-3 standings, Eric Camilli and François-Xavier Buresi led the drivers' and co-drivers' standings by seven points respectively. Nicolas Ciamin and Yannick Roche were second, with Yoann Bonato and Benjamin Boulloud in third in both standings, a further three points behind.

Entry list
The following crews were entered into the rally. The event was open to crews competing in the World Rally Championship, its support categories, the World Rally Championship-2, World Rally Championship-3, and Junior World Rally Championship and privateer entries that were not registered to score points in any championship. Fifty-five entries were received, with eleven crews entered in World Rally Cars, six Group R5 cars entered in the World Rally Championship-2, sixteen in the World Rally Championship-3. A further sixteen crews were entered in the Junior World Rally Championship in Ford Fiesta R2s.

Route
The brand-new  Nyckelvattnet stage was introduced into the rally. The Finnskogen stage, which runs across the border in Norway, returned to the itinerary. The Svullrya, Röjden and Rämmen stages, which were featured in the 2019 rally, were not included in the 2020 route.

The route was heavily revised in the week before the rally. Eight stages were cancelled due to unseasonably light snowfall in the region; tyre supplier Pirelli provided teams with studded tyres designed for driving on snow and ice, but without the expected snowfalls, the winter studs would be unable to properly grip the road surface. The changes to the route saw the second leg of the rally cancelled and the first leg split in two and run over separate days.

Original itinerary
All dates and times are CET (UTC+1).

Revised itinerary
All dates and times are CET (UTC+1).

Report

World Rally Cars
Elfyn Evans and Scott Martin broke clear in the lead to win the rally. Defending world champions Ott Tänak and Martin Järveoja inherited second after Kalle Rovanperä and Jonne Halttunen dropping vital seconds when he stalled his engine in the final test of Friday. Jari-Matti Latvala made his championship return with ex-driver Juho Hänninen, but they retired from the rally due to mechanical issue.

Classification

Special stages

Championship standings

World Rally Championship-2
Ole Christian Veiby and Jonas Andersson took an early lead, but Mads Østberg and Torstein Eriksen gained the top spot after they overcame brake issues to win the class.

Classification

Special stages

Championship standings

World Rally Championship-3
Emil Lindholm and Mikael Korhonen led WRC-3 after a trouble-free run, but they lost their lead to the eventual category winners Jari Huttunen and Mikko Lukka. Roland Poom and Ken Järveoja retired from the rally with a big accident.

Classification

Special stages

Championship standings

Junior World Rally Championship
Tom Kristensson and Joakim Sjöberg held a healthy lead throughout the rally to seal the win. Jon Armstrong and Noel O'Sullivan suffered a horrible high-speed crash, but they both walked away unharmed.

Classification

Special stages

Championship standings

Notes

References

External links

  
 2020 Rally Sweden at ewrc-results.com
 The official website of the World Rally Championship

2020 in Swedish motorsport
Sweden
February 2020 sports events in Sweden
2020